"Because" is a song written by John Lennon (credited to Lennon–McCartney) and recorded by the English rock band the Beatles. It was released on their 1969 album Abbey Road, immediately preceding the extended medley on side two of the record. It features a prominent three-part vocal harmony by Lennon, Paul McCartney and George Harrison, recorded three times to make nine voices in all.

Composition

The song begins with a distinctive electric harpsichord intro played by producer George Martin. The harpsichord is joined by Lennon's guitar (mimicking the harpsichord line) played through a Leslie speaker. Then vocals and bass guitar enter.

"Because" was one of few Beatles recordings to feature a Moog synthesiser, played by George Harrison. It appears in what Alan Pollack refers to as the "mini-bridge", and then again at the end of the song.

According to Lennon, the song's close musical resemblance to the first movement of Ludwig van Beethoven's Moonlight Sonata was no coincidence: "Yoko was playing Beethoven's 'Moonlight Sonata' on the piano... I said, 'Can you play those chords backwards?', and wrote 'Because' around them. The lyrics speak for themselves... No imagery, no obscure references."

Musical structure
With regard to citing Beethoven's "Moonlight Sonata", musicologist Walter Everett notes that "both arpeggiate triads and seventh chords in C minor in the baritone range of a keyboard instrument at a slow tempo, move through the submediant to II and approach vii dim7/IV via a common tone." But while acknowledging the unusual shared harmonies, Dominic Pedler notes that the relationship is not the result of reversing the order of the chords as Lennon suggested.

"Because" concludes with a vocal fade-out on Ddim, which keeps listeners in suspense as they wait for the return to the home key of C minor. Mellers states that: "causality is released and there is no before and no after: because that flat supertonic is a moment of revelation, it needs no resolution." The Ddim chord (and its accompanying melodic F) lingers until they resolve into the opening Am7 chord of "You Never Give Me Your Money".

Recording
George Martin notes that on "Because":

The main recording session for "Because" was on 1 August 1969, with vocal overdubs on 4 August, and a double-tracked Moog synthesiser overdub by Harrison on 5 August. As a result, this was the last song on the album to be committed to tape, although there were still overdubs for other incomplete songs. This approach took extensive rehearsal, and more than five hours of extremely focused recording, to capture correctly. McCartney and Harrison both said it was their favourite track on Abbey Road. Engineer Geoff Emerick said, "They knew they were doing something special, and they were determined to get it right."

A remixed version of the song, with the instrumentation removed so as to highlight the three-part harmony by Lennon, McCartney and Harrison, was released on 1996's Anthology 3 and as an a cappella on 2006's Love. In 2016, the Anthology 3 mix became the first recording by the Beatles to appear in a film trailer when it was featured in the trailer for Luc Besson's film Valerian and the City of a Thousand Planets.

Personnel
Personnel per Ian MacDonald:
 John Lennon – triple-tracked harmony vocals (middle register), guitar
 Paul McCartney – triple-tracked harmony vocals (high register), bass
 George Harrison – triple-tracked harmony vocals (low register), Moog synthesiser
 George Martin – electric harpsichord

Notes

References

 
 
 
 
 
 
 
 
 
 

The Beatles songs
1969 songs
Song recordings produced by George Martin
Songs written by Lennon–McCartney
Alice Cooper songs
Elliott Smith songs
Negativland songs
George Clinton (funk musician) songs
Songs published by Northern Songs
Popular songs based on classical music